County Road 51 is a  highway which runs north–south between Vågå and Gol, Norway. Part of the road runs concurrently with E16, between Leira and Fagernes. The  section across Valdresflye is designated a National Tourist Route. This section is closed in the winter. Prior to 2010, the road was known as National Road 51.

References

051
County roads in Buskerud
County roads in Oppland
National Tourist Routes in Norway